
Gmina Wierzchosławice is a rural gmina (administrative district) in Tarnów County, Lesser Poland Voivodeship, in southern Poland.

Villages
Gmina Wierzchosławice contains the villages and settlements of Bobrowniki Małe, Bogumiłowice, Gosławice, Kępa Bogumiłowicka, Komorów, Łętowice, Mikołajowice, Ostrów, Rudka, Sieciechowice and Wierzchosławice.

Neighbouring gminas
Gmina Wierzchosławice is bordered by the city of Tarnów and by the gminas of Borzęcin, Radłów, Tarnów, Wojnicz and Żabno.

References
Polish official population figures 2006

Wierzchoslawice
Tarnów County